The 1976–77 Quebec Nordiques season was the Nordiques fifth season, as they were coming off their best season to date in 1975–76, earning a team record 50 victories and 104 points, as they finished in second place in the Canadian Division.  In the post-season, Quebec win their first Avco Cup in team history.  Serge Bernier would win the WHA Playoff MVP trophy, as he earned 36 points for the Nordiques in 17 post-season games.

Offseason
During the off-season, the league saw the Toronto Toros move to Birmingham, Alabama, and be renamed the Birmingham Bulls, while the Cleveland Crusaders moved to Minneapolis, Minnesota to become the second version of the Minnesota Fighting Saints.  The league was back to twelve teams from fourteen the previous season, as the original Fighting Saints and Denver Spurs/Ottawa Civics franchise folded midway through the 1975–76 season.  The Nordiques would move from the Canadian Division to the Eastern Division, joining the Birmingham Bulls, Cincinnati Stingers, Indianapolis Racers, Minnesota Fighting Saints and New England Whalers in the division.

The Nordiques also made a head coaching change after their disappointing playoff appearance, as head coach Jean-Guy Gendron was relieved of his duties, and former Pittsburgh Penguins head coach Marc Boileau was his replacement.

Regular season
Quebec would have a very strong start to the season, winning eight of their first nine games to take a lead in the Eastern Division.  The Nordiques would cool off, as they had a record of 8–11–1 in their next twenty games, however, Quebec snapped out of their slump and won nine games in a row to take control of the Division.  The Nordiques would finish the season on top of the Eastern Division with a 47–31–3 record, earning 97 points, which was fourteen points higher than the second place Cincinnati Stingers.

Offensively, Quebec was led by Real Cloutier, who won the Bill Hunter Trophy awarded to the player who leads the league in scoring.  Cloutier scored 66 goals and 75 assists for a league best 141 points.  Marc Tardif scored 49 goals and 109 points despite missing 19 games, while Christian Bordeleau 32 goals and tied Cloutier with a team high 75 assists to earn 107 points for the season.  Serge Bernier narrowly missed out on the 100 point club, as he scored 43 goals and 96 points in 74 games.  On defense, newly acquired Jim Dorey led the blueline with 47 points in 73 games, while J. C. Tremblay had another productive season, earning 35 points in 53 games.  Paul Baxter had a team high 244 penalty minutes, which was the second highest total in the league.

In goal, Richard Brodeur had the majority of playing time, winning 29 games, while posting a team best 3.45 GAA, along with 2 shutouts.  Ed Humphreys and Serge Aubry split the backup duties, with Humphreys winning twelve games and a 3.58 GAA, while Aubry won six games with a 3.98 GAA.

Season standings

Schedule and results

Playoffs
In the opening round of the playoffs, Quebec would face the New England Whalers in a best of seven series.  The Whalers finished the year with a record of 35–40–6, earning 76 points, which was 21 fewer than the Nordiques.  The series opened with two games at Le Colisée, with Quebec winning them both, by scores of 5–2 and 7–3, to take the series lead.  The series moved over to New England for the next two games, however, Quebec stayed hot and defeated the Whalers 4–3 in overtime in the third game to take a 3–0 lead in the series.  New England fought off elimination in the fourth game, defeating the Nordiques 6–4, however, in the fifth game played back in Quebec, the Nordiques shutout New England 3–0 to win the series.

In the Eastern Division finals, the Nordiques faced off against the Indianapolis Racers, who finished the regular season in third place in the Eastern Division with a 36–37–8 record.  The Racers swept the second place Cincinnati Stingers in the opening round to advance to the division finals.  The series opened with two games in Quebec, and the Nordiques stayed unbeaten on home ice during the post-season, as they defeated Indianapolis 3–1 and 8–3 to take the early series lead.  The series shifted over to Indianapolis for the next two games, but the Nordiques won the third game, defeating the Racers 6–5 in overtime to put them on the brink of elimination.  Indianapolis finally managed to win a game in the fourth game of the series, shutting out the Nordiques 2–0, however, with the series back in Quebec for the fifth game, the Nordiques remained hot on home ice, easily winning the game 8–3, and advancing to the Avco Cup finals.

The Nordiques opponents in the Avco Cup finals was the Winnipeg Jets.  Winnipeg was the defending champions, as they won the 1976 Avco Cup.  The Jets had a record of 46–32–2, finishing with 94 points, and in second place in the Western Division.  Winnipeg defeated the Edmonton Oilers and Houston Aeros to earn a spot in the finals.  The series opened with two games in Quebec, and the Jets ended the Nordiques home ice winning streak with a 2–1 victory in the first game.  Quebec evened the series with a 6–1 thumping in the second game.  The series moved to Winnipeg for the next two games, and the Jets used their home ice to their advantage, as they took the third game by a 6–1 score, however, the Nordiques would once again even the series up, defeating Winnipeg 4–2 in the fourth game.  The series was back in Quebec for the fifth game, and the Nordiques destroyed the Jets 8–3 to take their first lead in the series, and were now only one win away from the championship.  The Jets responded in the sixth game played back in Winnipeg, crushing the Nordiques 12–3, to set up a seventh and deciding game in Quebec.  The Nordiques would take control of the seventh game early, coasting their way to an 8–2 victory, and winning their first Avco Cup in team history.  Serge Bernier would win the WHA Playoff MVP trophy, as he earned 36 points for the Nordiques in 17 post-season games.

Quebec Nordiques 4, New England Whalers 1 – Division Quarterfinals

Quebec Nordiques 4, Indianapolis Racers 1 – Division Semifinals

Quebec Nordiques 4, Winnipeg Jets 3 – Avco Cup Finals

Season stats

Scoring leaders

Goaltending

Playoff stats

Scoring leaders

Goaltending

Draft picks
Quebec's draft picks at the 1976 WHA Amateur Draft.

References

SHRP Sports
The Internet Hockey Database

Quebec Nordiques season, 1976–77
Quebec Nordiques seasons
Quebec